Rhabdochaeta lutescens is a species of tephritid or fruit flies in the genus Rhabdochaeta of the family Tephritidae.

Distribution
Ethiopia, Rwanda, Tanzania.

References

Tephritinae
Insects described in 1924
Taxa named by Mario Bezzi
Diptera of Africa